La Vendetta may refer to:
La Vendetta (film), a 1962 French comedy film
La Vendetta (novel), a novel by Honoré de Balzac
La Vendetta (TV series), a Filipino drama-suspense-thriller TV series

See also
 Vendetta (disambiguation)